Marco Mama (born 27 March 1991) is a Zimbabwe rugby union player who currently plays for Worcester Warriors in the Gallagher Premiership.

Club career
Mama was initially registered with Bristol as part of the Elite Player Development Group before joining their senior academy in 2009. Originally, he joined local rivals Worcester Warriors on a season-loan in the 2015–16 season. But, he signed a permanent deal with Worcester soon after, where he will officially join the club from the 2016–17 season.

International career
Mama represented Zimbabwe U20s team through the 2010 and 2011 IRB Junior World Championship. He was part of a RFU Championship XV team that defeated Canada 28-23 as part of their  2014 autumn tests, which was held at the Sixways Stadium in Worcester.

References

External links
Worcester Warriors Profile
Bristol Rugby Profile
ESPN scrum Profile

1991 births
Living people
Worcester Warriors players
Zimbabwean expatriate rugby union players
Zimbabwean expatriate sportspeople in England
Zimbabwean people of Italian descent
Rugby union flankers